Alexandra Friberg (born 1994) is a Swedish model and beauty queen who was crowned Miss Universe Sweden 2013 on 30 August 2013. Friberg represented Sweden at the Miss Universe 2013 in Moscow.

Early life
Alexandra is a Jewelry Designer, Artist, Designer in Stockholm.

Miss Sweden 2013
Alexandra Friberg was crowned Miss Universe Sweden 2013 at Club Ambassadeur Stockholm. She then went on to represent Sweden at Miss Universe 2013.

Other Pageants
Friberg was crowned Miss Beauty of The World in 2013, the pageant was held in Kyrgyzstan.

References

External links
Official blog

1995 births
Living people
Swedish beauty pageant winners
Swedish female models
Miss Universe 2013 contestants